Sviatlana Volnaya (en: Svetlana Volnaya) (born April 4, 1979 in Minsk, Belarusian Soviet Socialist Republic, USSR) is a Belarusian women's former basketball player. She played for Dynamo Moscow as guard and forward position. She is 187 cm tall and 72 kg weights. She also played for Virginia (U.S.) in college basketball.

Virginia  statistics 
Source

References

External links
Player Profile at sports.yahoo.com
WNBA profile

1982 births
Living people
Belarusian expatriate sportspeople in Belgium
Belarusian expatriate basketball people in the Czech Republic
Belarusian expatriate basketball people in France
Belarusian expatriate basketball people in Hungary
Belarusian expatriate basketball people in Italy
Belarusian expatriate basketball people in Russia
Belarusian expatriate basketball people in Turkey
Belarusian women's basketball players
Expatriate basketball people in Belgium
Belarusian expatriate basketball people in the United States
Fenerbahçe women's basketball players
New York Liberty players
Shooting guards
Small forwards
Basketball players from Minsk
Virginia Cavaliers women's basketball players
ŽKK Gospić players